Method of moments may refer to:

 Method of moments (electromagnetics), a numerical method in electromagnetics, also referred to as boundary element method in other fields
 Method of moments (statistics), a method of parameter estimation in statistics
 Method of moments (probability theory), a way of proving convergence in distribution in probability theory
 Second moment method, a technique used in probability theory to show that a random variable is positive with positive probability